Conilhac-de-la-Montagne (Languedocien: Conilhac de la Montanha) is a former commune in the Aude department in southern France. On 1 January 2019, it was merged into the new commune Roquetaillade-et-Conilhac.

Population

See also
Communes of the Aude department

References

Former communes of Aude
Aude communes articles needing translation from French Wikipedia
Populated places disestablished in 2019